Fuente del Maestre is a municipality in the province of Badajoz, Extremadura, Spain. It has a population of 6,943 and an area of 180 km².

References

Municipalities in the Province of Badajoz